Suzanne Rossell Cryer (born January 13, 1967) is an American actress known for her roles as Ashley on the ABC sitcom Two Guys and a Girl and as Laurie Bream on the HBO original series Silicon Valley. She featured in "The Yada Yada", an award-winning and fan favourite episode of Seinfeld. She has also performed on Broadway.

Early life
Cryer was born in Rochester, New York. She graduated from Greenwich High School in Greenwich, Connecticut in 1984 and then attended Yale University, where she attained a degree in English literature. She went on to study for a master's degree from the Yale School of Drama. During this time she spent a summer performing at the Utah Shakespeare Festival where her roles included Rosalind in As You Like It, and Anne in Richard III.

Career

After graduation, she appeared at Hartford Stage in The Rivals, Baltimore Center Stage in "Don Juan" and began making guest appearances on television series. She won critical acclaim for her performance in the premiere of Donald Margulies' two-person play Collected Stories at Southcoast Repertory Theater. She then went on to film Wag the Dog while simultaneously performing in the West coast premiere of Arcadia at the Mark Taper Forum. Her next major role was that of Josie in Neil Simon's Proposals which began at the Ahmanson Theater in Los Angeles and then toured the country before arriving on Broadway at the Broadhurst Theater. In 1997, Cryer made a guest appearance on an episode of Seinfeld in the episode "The Yada Yada." She played George's girlfriend Marcy, who frequently made use of the term "yada yada yada." In 1999, she joined the cast of the ABC sitcom Two Guys and a Girl (the show's second season) as Ashley Walker, a love interest for Berg (Ryan Reynolds). She became a series regular and remained with the show until it ended in 2001. She made two appearances on Frasier as Roz's sister, Denise, in the episodes "The Guilt Trippers" and "Sea Bee Jeebies." In recent years, she returned to theater to play Tracy Lord in The Philadelphia Story at Hartford Stage and appeared in Chris Shin's play What Didn't Happen at Playwright's Horizon. She made appearances in the television series Dexter, CSI: Miami, Shark, Bones, Grey's Anatomy and Desperate Housewives.

Personal life
Cryer is married and has three children.

Filmography

References

External links
 

1967 births
Living people
20th-century American actresses
21st-century American actresses
American film actresses
American stage actresses
American television actresses
Actresses from Rochester, New York
Yale School of Drama alumni
Greenwich High School alumni